Yousef Al-Nehmi, (born 8 September 1993 in Sanaa) is a Yemeni swimmer. He competed in the 50 m freestyle and 50 m butterfly events at the 2010 Asian Games and in the 50 m butterfly event at the 2013 Asian Indoor and Martial Arts Games. Al-Nehmi also took part in the 50 m freestyle and 50 m butterfly events at the 2013 World Aquatics Championships.

References

1993 births
Living people
Yemeni male swimmers
Swimmers at the 2010 Asian Games
Swimmers at the 2014 Asian Games
Asian Games competitors for Yemen
Yemeni male freestyle swimmers
Male butterfly swimmers